Aleksandrs Kokarevs (born 18 September 1955) is a former Latvian football player and manager.

Kokarevs played for Daugava Rīga the biggest part of his career. His best seasons were in 1977 (40 matches, 1 goal) and 1981 (36 matches, 1 goal). From 1978 to 1980 he played with Dinamo Leningrad. After the second season which Daugava played under Jānis Skredelis Kokarevs retired from the club as the competition in defense in Daugava was very tough and included Sergejs Semjonovs, Dainis Deglis and Jurijs Ševļakovs. Later Kokarevs played with Celtnieks Rīga in the Latvian league under Viktors Ņesterenko.

Kokarevs coaching career's highest point was when he was offered to coach RAF Jelgava before the Latvian Cup final in 1996. Kokarevs took up the job and his club won 2:1 against Skonto FC. Before that he had also managed Kvadrāts Rīga in 1. līga.

References

Latvian footballers
Soviet footballers
Daugava Rīga players
Living people
Association football defenders
1955 births
FC Dynamo Saint Petersburg players